This is a complete list of chapters for the manga series Fruits Basket. Written and illustrated by Natsuki Takaya, Fruits Basket is one of the best selling  manga of all time, with 30 million copies in print worldwide. The first chapter premiered in July 1998 in Hana to Yume magazine, where it was serialized until its conclusion in November 2006. The series focuses on Tohru Honda, an orphan girl who, after meeting Yuki, Kyo, and Shigure Sohma, learns that thirteen members of the Sohma family are possessed by the animals of the Chinese zodiac legend and are cursed to turn into their animal forms if they are embraced by anyone of the opposite sex or their bodies come under a great deal of stress. As the series progresses, Tohru meets the rest of the zodiac as well as the family's mysterious head, Akito Sohma, and eventually resolves to break the curse that burdens them.

The 136 untitled chapters were collected and published in 23  volumes by Hakusensha starting on January 19, 1999; the last volume was released on March 19, 2007. Hakusensha reprinted the series in twelve  (collector's edition) volumes under the Hana to Yume Comics Special imprint from September 4, 2015, to July 20, 2016. The collector's edition features new cover artwork by Natsuki Takaya, as well as color pages from the manga's original magazine serialization. Hakusensha also published the first three chapters of the series in a dual Japanese-English edition in November 2003. A full-color version of the manga was released in digital-only format in Japan in March 2019.

Fruits Basket was originally licensed for an English-language release in North America and the United Kingdom by Tokyopop and in Singapore by Chuang Yi. The Singapore edition was licensed for import to Australia and New Zealand by Madman Entertainment. All 23 volumes were released in both North America and Singapore. In October 2007, Tokyopop released a box set containing the first four volumes. It later began re-releasing the earlier volumes in omnibus Ultimate Editions that combined two sequential volumes in a single larger hardbound volume with new cover art. Six Ultimate Editions were released, covering the first twelve  volumes of the series. In 2011, Tokyopop closed its North American publishing division, and its licensed titles reverted to their original owners. Chuang Yi ceased operations a few years later. In 2015, Yen Press licensed the series for an updated English-language release, published in twelve omnibus editions in North America and the United Kingdom. The manga series is also licensed for regional language releases by Delcourt in France, Norma Editorial in Spain, Dynit in Italy, Carlsen Comics in Denmark, Germany and Sweden, Glénat in Benelux, Waneko in Poland, Sangatsu Manga in Finland, and by Comix-ART in Russia. In Latin America, Editorial Vid initially licensed the series for Spanish release in Mexico, with Panini taking over the license in Mexico later. Editorial Ivrea licensed the series for Spanish release in Argentina, and Editora JBC licensed it for release in Portuguese in Brazil. In Asia, Tong Li Publishing is currently the licensor of the series in Taiwan, Sparkle Roll licensed it in Hong Kong, and Seoul Cultural Publishers licensed it in South Korea. Chuang Yi also published a Simplified Chinese edition in Singapore.

On 4 September 2015, a new series, began serialization in HanaLaLaOnline. In August 2017, it was transferred to Manga Park. Originally, it was announced that Fruits Basket another would be finished on 3 December 2018, however, in March 2020, it was announced that the series would return with "chapter 13" (split in three parts) on 20 April 2020 (originally scheduled for 6 April). The second part of "chapter 13" was published on 4 May 2020 and the third part of "chapter 13" was published in September 2020, and Takaya announced that this would be "tentatively" the last chapter of the manga. The first collected volume was published on 19 August 2016. The series finished with its fourth volume, released on 18 February 2022. In November 2017, Yen Press announced the acquisition of the manga. 

A "2nd season" began on 20 April 2020. The second chapter was published on 20 June. The third and final chapter was published on 5 August 2020. The chapters were collected in the fourth volume of Fruits Basket Another. Yen Press digitally simulpublished the series. The chapters were published on 23 April 6 June and 9 July 2019. The first chapter of Fruits Basket: The Three Musketeers Arc 2 was published on 28 April 2020. The second chapter was published on 22 June 2020. The third chapter was published on 5 August 2020.



Volume list

Fruits Basket

Fruits Basket Another

Notes

References

External links
 Hakusensha's Fruits Basket website  (defunct; link via the Wayback Machine)
 Tokyopop's Fruits Basket website (defunct; link via the Wayback Machine)
 Chuang Yi's Fruits Basket website (defunct; link via the Wayback Machine)

Fruits Basket
Fruits Basket